Michael R. Moloney (born January 25, 1941) was an American politician in the state of Kentucky. He served in the Kentucky Senate as a Democrat from 1972 to 1996. He is a lawyer.

References

1941 births
Living people
Democratic Party Kentucky state senators